Nemophas trifasciatus is a species of beetle in the family Cerambycidae. It was described by Heller in 1919. It is known from Moluccas.

References

trifasciatus
Beetles described in 1919